Marshall Orme Wilson (June 20, 1860 – April 1, 1926) was an American banker and prominent member of New York Society during the Gilded Age.

Early life
 
Wilson was born in Nashville, Tennessee, on June 20, 1860. He was the eldest surviving son born to Richard Thornton Wilson Sr. and Melissa Clementine Johnston. His father was a multimillionaire investment banker originally from Loudon, Tennessee who served on the staff of Lucius B. Northrop, the Commissary-General of the Confederate States of America and invested in railways following the end of the War.  His parents resided at 511 Fifth Avenue, the former home of Boss Tweed.

Because of Wilson and his siblings' many advantageous marriages, the Wilsons were known in New York and Newport society as the "Marrying Wilsons." His sister Grace Graham Wilson married Cornelius "Neily" Vanderbilt III of the Vanderbilt family.  His brother, Richard Thornton Wilson Jr., was married to Marion Steedman Mason (1875–1947). Wilson's other two sisters, Belle Wilson, was married to the Honourable Sir Michael Henry Herbert, the British Ambassador to the United States during Theodore Roosevelt's administration and the brother of the Earl of Pembroke, and Mary Wilson, who was married to New York real estate heir, Ogden Goelet, and were the parents of Wilson's niece, Mary Goelet, who married the Duke of Roxburghe.

Career
In 1882, Wilson graduated from Columbia University.  Upon his graduation, he joined his father's firm, R. T. Wilson & Co. as a banker.

Along with his wife, a daughter of New York Society leader Caroline Schermerhorn Astor, Wilson was considered a social leader in both New York and Newport, Rhode Island.  He was a member of the Knickerbocker Club, the Church, and the Automobile of America. In 1894, Wilson was painted by Léon Bonnat, in a work now owned by the Metropolitan Museum of Art.

Personal life

In the early 1880s, Wilson met and fell in love with Caroline Schermerhorn "Carrie" Astor and they endeavored to marry. As he was a son of a Southerner and Civil War profiteer, the Astors disapproved of the prospect.  Reportedly, Carrie "starved herself into bulimia until her mother gave in and agreed to the marriage."

On November 18, 1884, the couple wed at the Astor mansion. Carrie, a great-granddaughter of John Jacob Astor, was the youngest daughter of William Backhouse Astor Jr. and Caroline Schermerhorn Astor, leader of the 400. Among her siblings was brother Colonel John Jacob Astor IV, who died aboard the RMS Titanic.  Together, Orme and Carrie had two sons; Marshall Orme Wilson Jr. in 1885—who was appointed United States Ambassador to Haiti by President Franklin D. Roosevelt in 1944—and Richard Thornton Wilson III in 1886.

Wilson died on April 1, 1926, in New York City.  His funeral service was held at the Trinity Chapel on 25th Street and was officiated by Bishop William T. Manning where the choir of Trinity Church sang the hymns "Nearer, My God, to Thee."  He was buried at Woodlawn Cemetery in the Bronx.  In his will, his wife received their residence and all of its belongings, and his sons inherited the residual estate, including the funds left by his father in trust for his sons, thereby avoiding Federal or State inheritance tax on the principal.

Residences

After his marriage to Carrie, the couple moved into a new home at 414 Fifth Avenue purchased by her father for them as a wedding present and furnished by his father.

Following his mother-in-law and brother-in-law's feud with Carrie's cousin William Waldorf Astor, Wilson hired the architectural firm of Warren and Wetmore to design a residence on East 64th Street.  The house, which began construction in 1900 was completed in 1903, was in close proximity of other Astor family residences, including Mrs. Astor's home designed by Richard Morris Hunt around the corner on the northeast corner of Fifth Avenue and 65th Street.  The residence had a Beaux Arts facade of Indiana Limestone and a mansard roof of blue slate and is five stories tall, sixty-five feet wide consisting of five bays, and featured a circular atrium.

Notes

References

External links
 

1860 births
1926 deaths
American bankers
Businesspeople from New York City
People from Nashville, Tennessee
People from Manhattan
Social leaders
Columbia College (New York) alumni